The 1985 VFL Grand Final was an Australian rules football game contested between the Essendon Football Club and Hawthorn Football Club, held at the Melbourne Cricket Ground in Melbourne on 28 September 1985. It was the 89th annual grand final of the Victorian Football League, staged to determine the premiers for the 1985 VFL season. The match, attended by 100,042 spectators, was won by Essendon by a margin of 78 points, marking that club's 14th premiership victory.

Background

It was the third consecutive year in which the two clubs met in the premiership decider, with Hawthorn having won the 1983 VFL Grand Final and Essendon having won the 1984 VFL Grand Final

At the conclusion of the home and away season, Essendon had finished first on the VFL ladder with 19 wins and 3 losses. Hawthorn had finished third (behind Footscray) with 15 wins, 6 losses and a draw.

In the finals series in the lead-up to the game, Hawthorn defeated Footscray in the Qualifying Final before meeting the Bombers in the second semi-final, which Essendon convincingly won by 40 points. The Hawks then met Footscray again in the preliminary final, which they won by 10 points to advance to the grand final. The Bombers advanced straight to the grand final on the back of their second semi-final win.

Match summary
The grand final is often remembered for a bench-clearing brawl which broke out on the wing soon after the opening bounce.

Essendon edged ahead early and increased its margin slightly at each of the changes, leading by nine points at quarter time, 18 points at half time and 30 points at three quarter time.  The Bombers then scored a record 11.3 (69) in the final quarter to completely blow the game open. Paul Salmon kicked six goals for Essendon and Roger Merrett five. 

Forward Dermott Brereton starred for the Hawks with eight goals, the most ever in a losing grand final side (a record that stood until Gary Ablett's current record of nine goals in Geelong's losing 1989 VFL Grand Final against Hawthorn). Brereton was also reported three times in the game: he received a four match suspension for rough conduct and two counts of striking arising from the brawl.

The Norm Smith Medal was awarded to Essendon's Simon Madden for being judged the best player afield.

At the conclusion of the game, the 332nd and final game of Hawks great Leigh Matthews' 16-year career, Matthews was chaired off the ground by his teammates.

Essendon coach Kevin Sheedy said after the game to his players "It took you five years to play four quarters of football, but I'm patient. It was a wonderful effort of football, the way football should be played."

Hawthorn would play in five of the next six grand finals including winning the 1986 VFL Grand Final, while Essendon would have to wait until the 1993 AFL Grand Final before their next Premiership success.

Teams

Goalkickers

See also
 1985 VFL season

References

Bibliography
 The Official statistical history of the AFL 2004 
 Ross, J. (ed), 100 Years of Australian Football 1897–1996: The Complete Story of the AFL, All the Big Stories, All the Great Pictures, All the Champions, Every AFL Season Reported, Viking, (Ringwood), 1996.

External links
 
 

VFL/AFL Grand Finals
Grand
Essendon Football Club
Hawthorn Football Club